The Brigade World Trade Center, Chennai is a 28-storeyed commercial and residential centre in Chennai, India. Located at Perungudi, it was made operational in March 2020. The complex also includes a conference/exhibition centre. The towers are IGBC LEED Platinum and USGBC LEED Gold certified. The centre is a member of the World Trade Centers Association (WTCA). The Tower A of the WTC complex is the tallest commercial establishment in the city.

History
The land acquisition was facilitated by Perungudi Real Estates, a special purpose vehicle formed by Brigade Enterprises and GIC, with the help of real estate firm Jones Lang LaSalle (JLL). The foundation stone was laid on 9 June 2017. Initially expected to be operational by March 2020, the centre became functional officially in September 2021.

Features
The complex consists of five towers, including two office towers, a hotel tower and two residential towers (the latter three are currently under construction). Built on a  plot and developed as a Grade A++ commercial development, all the towers have three basements. The first office tower (Tower A) has 28 floors (ground and 27 floors) above the street, the second office tower (Tower B) 20 floors (ground and 19 floors), the third (hotel) tower 8 floors, and the fourth (restaurant) and the fifth (cafeteria and utility) towers 5 floors each. The total floor space of the construction would be . Upon completion, Tower A will be the tallest commercial structure in Chennai. It consists of premium retail and hotel within the campus. Once fully operational, the WTC can house 20,000 to 25,000 employees. A 298-unit high-end residential apartments will also be constructed. Besides, there will be another tower with 80 Marriott Exclusive apartments. These towers are to be completed by October 2024.

The development will be led by the WTCA. The WTC has become an important landmark of Chennai city.

Operations
The WTC officially become functional in September 2021 with its first occupant, Kissflow Inc., a software-as-a-service (SaaS) company, moving its 350 employees into its WTC office. In March 2022, Amazon opened its office at the WTC, occupying 18 floors across  to accommodate 6,000 employees.

See also 

 List of world trade centers
 List of tallest buildings in Chennai
 Architecture of Chennai
 List of twin buildings and structures

References

External links
World Trade Center Chennai
 Brigade Residences official page

High-technology business districts in Chennai
Special Economic Zones of India
Skyscraper office buildings in Chennai
Skyscrapers in Chennai